is an original anime television series created by Yasuomi Umetsu and produced by Fuji TV, Aniplex, Kyoraku, Dentsu, and A-1 Pictures. It is directed by Umetsu, with Shingo Adachi as a character designer, Niθ as a mechanical designer, and Shirō Hamaguchi composing the music. Episode 1 was previewed at a screening in Tokyo on October 5, 2013. Regular broadcasting began on October 10, 2013.

Plot
Galilei Donna, set in 2061, is the story of the three Ferrari sisters—Hozuki, Kazuki, and Hazuki—descendants of Galileo Galilei who have completely different personalities and thus are constantly at odds with each other, until they are falsely accused of terrorism as part of a conspiracy involving an ancient treasure said to be left behind by Galileo. As the only way to clear their names is to beat their enemies to the treasure, the Ferrari sisters follow the clues left by their ancestor and embark in a journey around the world to unveil its secrets.

Characters

Ferrari family

The 13-year-old youngest Ferrari sister, junior high school student and one of the four descendants of Galileo Galilei, she is known for being somewhat flighty. Even if she tries something she doesn't keep at it for very long, due to her lack of confidence. Science is her only strong point that she inherited from her ancestor Galileo and parents. She has a big interest in Japanese culture and food, and is constantly seen eating Japanese confection. She is reserved and quiet, but in truth she is most likely to take action first of the three sisters and stand up for her own rights. Even though not shown in the beginning and her comment about her family being in pieces, she is actually very protective of her siblings and parents. By finding the drawings left by Galileo, she gradually started wandering what love would feel like, since the things written on the drawings were love letters. Later on her trip to the past and the few days spent there, she gradually fell in love with the young Galileo. And later realizing that the feelings they both shared were mutual by finding the seventh drawing. She has a fondness for goldfishes as she owns a pet goldfish and will build machines with the same appearance, referred to by most people as being weird.

The 17-year-old middle Ferrari sister, a high school student, and one of the four descendants of Galileo Galilei. She is the cool type who tries not to show her emotions, but is in fact the most sensitive in the family. She is quite timid and prone to worrying. She has strong physical abilities and is very skilled at Shorinji Kempo. She is also very skilled at cooking, and sometimes makes fun of Hazuki due to her lack in cooking. Early on when she found out about her sisters Hozuki`s ability, she felt jealous and useless that she was the only one in the family that couldn't understand and do anything, but later on accepted Hozuki`s talent. She seems to have a crush on a classmate of hers in school, but nothing more than his picture on her mobile phone is revealed in the series, she is always looking at her phone of his picture and didn't want to throw away her phone when her sisters handed out walkies-talkies due to the possibility of the enemy tracking them, although he is shown in the court room in the last episode as a witness to the indiction of the Ferrari sisters.

The 20-year-old eldest Ferrari sister. She is very frank, that it immediately shows up on her face and says whatever she is thinking. She is a college student living on her own studying law in hope to become a prosecutor one day, even though her grades are quite low. She is also one of the four descendants of Galileo Galilei. She has a tendency to drink and will often behave wildly.  She has an amazing verbal attack power, but has very strong feelings of wanting to protect her sisters. Whenever she thinks or knows something that is against the law of justice and or court, she will go wild and start to talk all about it. As seen in episode five, she argues about that stealing is still stealing and there shouldn't be any of those going on just for being against Adni Moon. Due to her standing up to the leader of Black Ganymede, it seems that he has taken a liking to her and so has given her the nickname "Bambina" (Italian for "child"). Together they have been referred to as oil and water, but later on she became quite dependent on him, as she wanted his help and strength to protect her sisters.

She is the 43-year-old  divorced mother of the Ferrari sisters. She is an engineer and the original descendant of Galileo Galilei. Sylvia is very proud of her heritage and tries to get Hazuki, Kazuki, and Hozuki to feel the same way, but her efforts seem to have the opposite effect on the three girls. At the end of the series she is shown with her husband together again taking a trip with the family to Japan.

The father of the 3 sisters. Japanese who speaks in Kansai dialect. Currently is estranged with his wife Sylvia. He is also an aviation and space engineer, and is a professor at a university. His father is currently living in Kyoto, Japan. At the end of the series he is shown with his wife and family together again taking a trip to Japan.

Others

The young leader of the air pirate troupe called Black Ganymede. As the charismatic boss of an outlaw group that is the subject of an international police search. He has a sharp mind, strong physical abilities, and is a good man, he described himself as having no weakness since the two things italian men are weak against are good food and women. His crew is made up of people he saved as children from an abusive orphanage and has gained their trust and friendship. He seems to have a crush on Hazuki, who he calls "Bambina" (Italian for "child"). And has been referred to as a stalker due to following her all the time. He is quite cruel when facing an opponent but has shown kindness and respect numerous times when the sisters were not capable of fighting back. He even lent a helping hand when Hazuki was sick, and has also proposed that he will protect her, where she smiled and gladly accepted his help, making him surprised and blush, not knowing she would answer immediately. Before leaving he promised that next time he will be taking her and the Galileo Tesoro with him.

A publishing editor.  She is enchanted by the things Galileo Galilei left behind and chases after the unsolved puzzles left behind. She is a self-proclaimed Galileo Maniac, and her extensive knowledge about Galileo is of great assistance to the sisters as she travels with them in Hozuki's ship, which she christened with the name "The Galileo." She is actually a spy working for Messier who was entrusted with the task of helping the sisters find Galileo's sketches and later on disposing of them by the order of Roberto. Due to her strong feelings for Roberto it was hard neglecting his orders. However, she had become greatly attached to the sisters during the search that she turns against Roberto when he tries to kill the sisters.

The adopted son of the chief executive of the world-famous Adnimoon Company and the main antagonist. His birth parents, presented as wealthy but kind and charitable, to the point that they gave their son's birthday feast to some local beggars, they were killed in an unexplained air attack on his city. When he asked the beggars to help his trapped father they stole a diamond pendant from the corpse of his mother, and knocked him into the path of a falling wall, crushing his left leg and right arm. He is a cruel person who does not care about others. All that matters to him is prevailing justice on the people who are ungrateful, as he did in the hospital when the Black Ganymede had captured him.

He and Hozuki Ferrari both share the same hobby and are interested in Galileo's moon sketches and learnings. He is an eager boy who is  plans things through. He also seems to care about people without knowing how to show them, but is actually really friendly. He also has a crush on Karen his childhood friend, and has even made a telescope as a present to give her. His dream was to start school next year.

She is quiet and seems to have a hard time speaking her thoughts out. Theo is her childhood friend. She has feelings for him, though it seems a little bit hard for her to say it. She might have been a little envious about Hozuki. However, she has a positive attitude toward her because she is glad there would be somebody to understand Theo and his sayings.

Hans is very good man who created the Micro-Doctor, a medical robot to heal his daughter for a surgical disease. He lives by himself in a park and is very poor, as described by the sisters he smells kind of bad. He is also generous to Hozuki, Hazuki, Kazuki, and Anna as they gave him food, as he was almost going to starve. He also helped Hozuki recover from her sickness with the Micro-Doctor.

The AI created by Hozuki for the airship Galileo.  Grande Rosso is based on Picco Rosso, an artificial goldfish that Hozuki made, but due to the loss of her home, Picco Rosso was brought onto the airship with Hozuki while travelling, but upon Hozuki going back in time Picco Rosso is given to Galileo as a present before they departed ways. Grande Rosso can be activated when someone reads the manual using the voice recognition technique.

The astronomer who is the ancestor of the Ferrari sisters.  Hozuki is thrown into the past to meet him when the Galileo Tesoro activates. Galileo ends up falling in love with Hozuki while she's thrown back into the past, but unable to tell his feelings for her after she left, he decided to write his feelings and experiences with her on the moon sketches. Hence the love letters. Hoping she would find them in the future. It is shown that he too has a liking to the confeti that Hozuki likes to eat.

Media

Anime
The anime began airing on October 10, 2013, in the noitamina block on Fuji TV. The series' opening theme is "Synchromanica" by Negoto and its ending theme is "Innocent" by earthmind. The anime is licensed by Crunchyroll with distribution by Discotek Media, and they've released the series on DVD July 28, 2015.

Episode list

References

External links
  
 

2061
A-1 Pictures
Anime with original screenplays
Noitamina
Television series set in the 2060s
Discotek Media
Fuji TV original programming